Mian Rud (also Romanized as Mīān Rūd and Meyān Rūd) is a village in Ahmadabad Rural District, Hasanabad District, Eqlid County, Fars Province, Iran. At the 2006 census, its population was 329, in 84 families.

References 

Populated places in Eqlid County